Khusroe Khan (also spelled Khusrau Khan or Khusraw Khan or Khusrow Khan) may refer to:
Amir Khusrow, Khusroe Khan, Amir - (1253-1325 CE)
Khusro Khan, Khusroe Khan, Vizier - (d.1320 CE)